Christopher M. Murray is the former chief judge of the Michigan Court of Claims.

References

American judges
Living people
Year of birth missing (living people)
Place of birth missing (living people)